Kharajian (also Romanized as Kharājīān, Kharājeyān, and Kharājīyān; also known as Karajīān) is a village in Badr Rural District, in the Central District of Ravansar County, Kermanshah Province, Iran. At the 2006 census, its population was 621, in 122 families.

References 

Populated places in Ravansar County